Man of Iron is a 1981 Polish film.

Man of Iron, Men of Iron, or variation, may refer to:

 Sailors of the age of sail, with "ships of wood and men of iron"
 Men of Iron, a 1891 novel by Howard Pyle
 Man of Iron (2009 film), a Chinese film
 Man of Iron (1972 film), a Hong Kong film
 Man of Iron (1935 film), an American film
 A Man of Iron, a 1925 U.S. film
 Man of Iron (horse) (born 2006), a U.S. racehorse
 Steel (John Henry Irons), a DC Comics character given the moniker "Man of Iron"
 Overman, an alternative version of Superman given the moniker "Man of Iron"

See also
 "Little Men of Iron", the 1902 Stanley Cup winning team of the Montreal Hockey Club
 Man of Steel (disambiguation)
 Iron Man (disambiguation)
 Iron (disambiguation)
 Man (disambiguation)